Bess Freedman (born May 31, 1969) is an American businesswoman. She is currently the CEO of Brown Harris Stevens. Previously, she also practiced law.

Career
Born in Troy, New York, Freedman got her undergraduate degree from Ithaca College and completed her Juris Doctor degree at the University of the District of Columbia. She practiced law as an Assistant State's Attorney and worked as an attorney at Legal Aid Society. In 2003, Freedman joined the Corcoran Group, an American real estate firm. At the Corcoran Group, she served as Senior Managing Director for the East Side headquarters.

In 2013, Freedman joined Brown Harris Stevens (BHS) as Senior Vice President. In 2017, she was named co-president of BHS alongside Hall Willkie. Less than a year later, Freedman was appointed as the company's first CEO.

In 2018, while at an event for the Asian Real Estate Association of America, Ms. Freedman made headlines for publicly confronting John Catsimatidis, CEO of the Red Apple Group, for comments he made about Supreme Court nominee Brett Kavanaugh.

In 2020, Freedman became one of the first NYC-based brokerage leaders to offer Election Day as a paid company holiday to all employees nationwide. In 2022, when Roe vs. Wade was overturned, Ms. Freedman announced that Brown Harris Stevens would reimburse travel expenses up to $4,000 for any real estate agent or employee who must travel to access safe and legal reproductive healthcare.

References 

People from Troy, New York
Ithaca College alumni
University of the District of Columbia alumni
Legal Aid Society

1969 births
Living people
20th-century American women lawyers
20th-century American lawyers
American women chief executives
21st-century American businesswomen
21st-century American businesspeople